GTP binding protein 2 is a protein that in humans is encoded by the GTPBP2 gene.

Function

GTP-binding proteins, or G proteins, constitute a superfamily capable of binding GTP or GDP. G proteins are activated by binding GTP and are inactivated by hydrolyzing GTP to GDP. This general mechanism enables G proteins to perform a wide range of biologic activities.

References

Further reading